Paul Judson (born April 10, 1934) is a former American basketball player. He was selected as the twelfth pick in the 1956 NBA draft, but did not play in the National Basketball Association (NBA).

Basketball 

In high school, he helped lead Alden-Hebron High School to the 1952 Illinois high school basketball state championship. Judson served as the team captain for the 1955–56 Illinois Fighting Illini men's basketball team and helped guide them to an 18–4 record. He was named an honorable mention All-American by the Associated Press in his final college season.

Personal life 

His brother, Howie Judson, played for the Chicago White Sox from 1948 to 1952 and the Cincinnati Redlegs from 1953 to 1954.

Twin brother Phil Judson was also teammate on the same Fighting Illini basketball teams.

Uncle to former Northern Illinois University head coach, Rob Judson. Rob is the son of Phil.

Honors
 1955 - Team MVP
 1955 - 1st Team All-Big Ten
 1955 - Honorable Mention All American
 1955 - University of Illinois Athlete of the Year
 1956 - Team Captain
 1956 - Consensus 1st Team All-Big Ten
 1956 - 3rd Team All American
 1973 - Inducted into the Illinois Basketball Coaches Association's Hall of Fame as a player.

College statistics

University of Illinois

Notes

Further reading 

1934 births
Living people
All-American college men's basketball players
Basketball players from Illinois
Illinois Fighting Illini men's basketball players
People from Hebron, Illinois
Syracuse Nationals draft picks
American men's basketball players
Guards (basketball)